Stephanie Soechtig is an American director and filmmaker who is known for documentaries such as Tapped (2009), Fed Up (2014), Under the Gun (2016) and The Devil We Know (2018).

Education
Soechtig earned her BA in Broadcast Journalism from the New York University. She later studied at Western Connecticut State University.

Career
Soechtig was a co-founder of Atlas Films, a production company that produced  documentary films on social issues, along with Michael Walrath and his wife, Michelle Walrath. They produced Tapped in 2009, which she co-directed  with Jason Lindsey. She directed, wrote and produced the feature length documentary film, Fed Up, in 2014. Soechtig directed Under the Gun in collaboration with Katie Couric, who also worked with her on Tapped and Fed Up. Under the Gun was a "Sundance favorite". According to The Guardian, it provided an "in-depth look at the ways gun control advocates have tried to counteract the power of the National Rifle Association."

Awards

Soechtig won the Vancouver International Film Festival (VIFF) Impact award for her documentary The Devil We Know in 2018. The VIFF cited Dennis Harvey, Variety as saying that Soechtig "presents an unusually engrossing documentary for this type of subject, with human interest always in the forefront despite the complex timeline of events, issues and information presented." She "presides over an expert assembly that’s sharp in every department."

References

American documentary film directors
Living people
21st-century American non-fiction writers
21st-century American women writers
American women non-fiction writers
American women screenwriters
Year of birth missing (living people)
21st-century American screenwriters